After the Bath may refer to:

Paintings
 After the Bath (Renoir), a 1910 painting
 After the Bath, an 1888 painting by Pierre-Auguste Renoir
 After the Bath, Woman Drying Herself, a drawing by Edgar Degas, c. 1890
 After the Bath, an 1870 painting by Frédéric Bazille
 After the Bath, an 1875 painting by Andrei Belloli
 After the Bath, a painting by Paul Louis Bouchard (1853–1937)
 After the Bath, an 1875 painting by William-Adolphe Bouguereau 
 After the Bath, an 1894 painting by William-Adolphe Bouguereau at the Ricardo Brennand Institute
 After the Bath, a 1901 painting by Mary Cassatt
 After the Bath, a painting by William Powell Frith (1819–1909)
 After the Bath, a painting by John Henry Hatfield, 1896 second-place Hallgarten Prize-winner
 After the Bath, a, 1892 painting by Edvard Munch
 After the Bath, a 1924 painting by Károly Patkó
 After the Bath, or Venus Rising from the Sea—A Deception, an 1822 painting by Raphaelle Peale
 After the Bath, a 1911 painting by E. Phillips Fox
 After the Bath, a 1910 painting by Théo van Rysselberghe
 After the Bath, a painting by S. G. Thakur Singh (1899–1976)
 Efter badet (Norwegian, 'After the Bath'), an 1889 painting by Olaf Isaachsen
 Efter badet (Danish, 'After the Bath'), a 1911 painting by Fritz Syberg

Sculptures
 After the Bath, a sculpture by Frano Kršinić (1897–1982)
 After the Bath, a sculpture by Pietro Lazzarini (1842–1918) 
 Efter badet (Swedish, 'After the Bath'), a 1976 sculpture by Pye Engström
 Etter badet (Norwegian, 'After the Bath'), a sculpture by Anders Svor (1864–1929)